Gol Tappeh-ye Taghamin (also Romanized as Gol Tappeh-ye Ţaghāmīn; also known as Goltappeh-ye Ţafāmīn and Kol Tappeh-ye Ţaqāmīn) is a village in Taghamin Rural District, Korani District, Bijar County, Kurdistan Province, Iran. At the 2006 census, its population was 260, in 65 families. The village is populated by Azerbaijanis.

References 

Towns and villages in Bijar County
Azerbaijani settlements in Kurdistan Province